Each year the Mississippi Miss. Basketball award is given to the best high school girls basketball player in the state of Mississippi by The Clarion-Ledger.

Award winners

Most winners by high school and college

See also
Mississippi Mr. Basketball

References

Mr. and Miss Basketball awards
Basketball in Mississippi
Women's sports in Mississippi
Lists of people from Mississippi
Lists of American sportswomen
American women's basketball players
Mississippi sports-related lists